The 1970–71 Scottish Second Division was won by Partick Thistle who, along with second placed East Fife, were promoted to the First Division. Brechin City finished bottom.

Table

References 

 Scottish Football Archive

Scottish Division Two seasons
2
Scot